The 2009–10 season of the División de Honor de Futbol Sala is the 21st season of top-tier futsal in Spain.

Teams

Stadia and locations

League table

Source: lnfs.es

Championship playoff

Quarter-finals

First leg

Second leg

Third leg

Semi-finals

First leg

Second leg

Third leg

Final

First leg

Second leg

Third leg

Fourth leg

Top scorers

See also
2009–10 División de Plata de Futsal
Futsal in Spain

References

External links
2009–10 season at lnfs.es

2009 10
1
futsal
Spain